Madison Township is a township in Mercer County, in the U.S. state of Missouri.

Madison Township was established in 1843.

References

Townships in Missouri
Townships in Mercer County, Missouri